Waleed Ahmed Hassan Al-Mazam (Arabic:وليد أحمد; born 22 January 1986) is an Emirati footballer. He currently plays for Al Hamriyah as a winger. He has played in the Arabian Gulf League, Arabian Gulf Cup, and President's Cup in the UAE.

References

External links
 

Emirati footballers
1986 births
Living people
Association football midfielders
Al Ahli Club (Dubai) players
Ajman Club players
Sharjah FC players
Dibba FC players
Al-Ittihad Kalba SC players
Hatta Club players
Al Hamriyah Club players
Footballers at the 2006 Asian Games
UAE First Division League players
UAE Pro League players
Asian Games competitors for the United Arab Emirates